Tom Lebeau (born 23 July 1998) is a French professional footballer who plays as a midfielder for  club Concarneau on loan from Niort.

Career
Lebeau made his Ligue 2 debut on 28 April 2017, coming on as a substitute for Quentin Daubin in the 0–3 defeat to Stade de Reims. On 12 June 2019 he joined Stade Lavallois on loan for the duration of the 2019–20 season.

On 7 June 2022, Lebeau joined Concarneau on loan for the 2022–23 season.

Career statistics

References

External links
 
 
 

1998 births
Living people
People from Niort
Sportspeople from Deux-Sèvres
French footballers
Association football midfielders
Chamois Niortais F.C. players
Stade Lavallois players
US Concarneau players
Ligue 2 players
Championnat National players
Championnat National 3 players
Footballers from Nouvelle-Aquitaine